Blind Bay is a small bay on Shaw Island in San Juan County, Washington. On an island near its mouth is Blind Island State Park.

References

Bays of Washington (state)
Bodies of water of San Juan County, Washington